Bloodbath over Bloodstock is a live DVD by Swedish death metal band Bloodbath. It features the entire live set the band played at Bloodstock Open Air in August 2010. It was filmed by the production company The Dark Box. It was released on 25 April 2011, by Peaceville Records. This is the final release with Mikael Åkerfeldt in the band as he quit in 2012.

Track listing

Reception
The DVD placed No. 3 in Finland and No. 9 in Sweden on the "Music DVD" chart.

Personnel
Mikael Åkerfeldt – vocals
Martin "Axe" Axenrot – drums
Anders "Blakkheim" Nyström – guitar
Jonas Renkse – bass
Per "Sodomizer" Eriksson – guitar
Travis Smith – album cover

References

2011 live albums
Bloodbath albums
Albums with cover art by Travis Smith (artist)